Aristotelis Kollaras (born 31 December 1995) is a Greek professional footballer who plays as a left-back for Super League 2 club Veria.

Honours
Aittitos Spata
Gamma Ethniki: 2017–18

References

1995 births
Living people
Greek footballers
Super League Greece players
Football League (Greece) players
Gamma Ethniki players
Super League Greece 2 players
Xanthi F.C. players
Panargiakos F.C. players
Aittitos Spata F.C. players
Ionikos F.C. players
Kavala F.C. players
Almopos Aridea F.C. players
Veria NFC players
Association football defenders
Footballers from Kavala